Afro-Iraqis are Iraqi people of African Zanj heritage. Historically, their population has concentrated in the southern port city of Basra, as Basra was the capital of the slave trade in Iraq. Afro-Iraqis speak Arabic and mostly adhere to Islam. Some Afro-Iraqis can still speak Swahili along with Arabic. Afro-Iraqi leaders claim that there are roughly between 500,000 and 1,500,000 Afro-Iraqis, however this is not verified by official figures. Their origins date back to the time of the Arab slave trade between the 9th century AD to the 19th century AD. Many are from the district of Zubair, descendants of the people who came to Iraq from East Africa. Some came as sailors, whereas others came as traders, immigrants, religious scholars, or enslaved people over the course of many centuries, beginning in the 9th century CE.

Mythic origins 
Arab myths agree that the Cushitic king Nimrod crossed from beyond the waters of Ethiopia in the earliest times with an army, and established a civilization. Many existing sites in Iraq are still named after Nimrod. The Quran does not mention Nimrod by name, but Arab stories about Nimrod have resulted in him being referenced as a tyrant in Muslim cultures.

Jewish tradition recounts the tale of King Nimrod as well. It is stated in the book of Genesis that Nimrod was a mighty hunter of great renown and the first to build cities over the face of the world. He ruled in Mesopotamia, which includes modern-day Iraq.

Because of the legendary Nimrod's Cushitic origin (often identified with the historical Kingdom of Kush in what is today southern Egypt and northern Sudan), many believe that Afro-Iraqis now living in areas are his literal descendents. This is unlikely to be literally true for all afro-Iraqi citizens, as their presence in Iraq dates back only to the 9th century CE, whereas the Kingdom of Kush ended in the 6th century CE.

Social condition
The Arab Muslim institution of slavery allowed enslaved people to own land, and enslavement was not generally hereditary. Conversion to Islam sometimes enabled enslaved people to escape their condition. Skin color played a distinctive role even amongst slaves, however, and discrimination based on skin colour existed, and continues to be a problem in Iraqi society. Today, many Afro-Iraqis activists report that they are denied job opportunities on the basis of their skin colour and ethnic background. Afro-Iraqis are  well known as street musicians, as they historically experienced employment discrimination. Afro-Iraqis are also frequently called "Abeed", a pejorative meaning "slave" in Arabic.

Heritage
Most Afro-Iraqis still are able to maintain rituals related to healing that are of Zanj origin. The languages used in these rituals are Swahili and Arabic. Percussion instruments such as drums and tambourines are used in these ceremonies. Songs such as Dawa Dawa are in a syncretic mixture of Arabic and Swahili. The song, which is about curing people of illness, is used in the shtanga ceremony, for physical health. Another ceremony, called nouba, takes its name from the Arabic word for paroxysm or shift, as Sophi performers take turns at chanting and dancing to ritualistic hymns. There are also unique ceremonies to remember the dead and for occasions such as weddings. Although the vast majority of Afro-Iraqis are Muslim, a shrinking minority still practices these traditions. Few Afro-Iraqis can still speak Swahili.

See also

Afro-Arab
Afro-Iranians
Afro-Turks
Afro-Palestinians
Arab slave trade
Afro-Saudis
Swahili people
Zanj
Zanj Empire

References

External links
The hidden Black Iraq

Ethnic groups in Iraq
 
African diaspora in the Middle East
African diaspora in the Arab world